The Warner Trail is a  New England hiking trail which extends from Diamond Hill in the northeast corner of Rhode Island northeast through Norfolk County, Massachusetts to Canton,  south of Boston.

Description 
Its route winds through what has become a primarily suburban landscape punctuated by significant pockets of rural conservation land and state forest. The terrain is hilly and occasionally rugged with ledges of metamorphic rock and granite; forest cover is of the oak-hickory type. Completed in 1947, the trail originally stretched from Diamond Hill to the Blue Hills Reservation in Randolph, Massachusetts, but encroaching development had truncated the route by the 1970s. Plans to rebuild that lost connection were put forward in 2003 as part of Massachusetts' Commonwealth Connections statewide greenway initiative. The Appalachian Mountain Club and the Friends of the Warner Trail maintain the Warner Trail.

The trail passes through Cumberland, Rhode Island and the Massachusetts towns of Canton, Sharon, Foxboro, Wrentham, and Plainville. There are no overnight facilities on the Warner Trail. The Warner Trail connects to the  Bay Circuit Trail.

Route features
White rectangles and metal disks mark the trail. From south to north, the trail visits a number of high points with ledge-top views including Diamond Hill , also known for its defunct ski area; Sunset Rock, Wampum Rock, Knuckup Hill, Outlook Rock, Pinnacle Hill, Goat Rock, High Rock, Pierce Hill, Allen Ledge, Bluff Head, and Moose Hill, the trail's high point. The Warner Trail also visits a number of bodies of water and passes through three state forests (Wrentham State Forest, F. Gilbert Hills State Forest, and Foxboro State Forest), the new Diamond Hill State Park in Rhode Island, and the Massachusetts Audubon Society's Moose Hill Sanctuary.

References 

 Massachusetts Trail Guide (2004). Boston: Appalachian Mountain Club.
 Commonwealth Connections proposal PDF download. Retrieved April 27, 2015.

External links 
 "Warner Trail" Sharon Friends of Conservation. Retrieved March 1, 2008.
 Moose Hill Audubon Sanctuary. Retrieved March 1, 2008.
 Moose Hill maps . Retrieved March 1, 2008.
 F. Gilbert Hills map . Retrieved March 1, 2008.
 Wrenthan State Forest map . Retrieved March 1, 2008.

Hiking trails in Massachusetts
Hiking trails in Rhode Island
Cumberland, Rhode Island
Protected areas of Providence County, Rhode Island
Protected areas of Norfolk County, Massachusetts